The Dolní Kounice Synagogue is a synagogue in Dolní Kounice in the South Moravian Region of the Czech Republic. It was built in 1652–1655.

History
First traces of Jewish settlement in Dolní Kounice are from half of 15th century. The first written mention of a synagogue here comes from 1581. The old synagogue was located on eastern part of the village and was destroyed by Swedish troops during the Thirty Years' War in 1645.

A new one has been built in the middle of the new ghetto in 1652–1655. It was built in the Baroque style and is one of the oldest synagogues in Moravia. The building has rectangular ground plan and two floors. In the middle of the 19th century, new tract was added and used to extends tribune for women.

In the early 1940s, Nazis closed down the religious services and moved the decorations to the Jewish Museum in Prague. After the war the building was used as storehouse. In 1991 it was returned, as a part of restitutions, to the Jewish community in Brno. In 1994 the synagogue was reconstructed.

Present
Today the synagogue hosts small collection of Jewish historical artefacts and art exhibitions.

Gallery

References

External links
Short history of Jewish district in Dolní Kounice

References
Jaroslav Klenovský: "Židovská obec v Dolních Kounicích" (Jewish community in Dolní Kounice), published by the town in 1997, 44 pages.

Former synagogues in the Czech Republic
Synagogue
Synagogues preserved as museums
17th-century synagogues
Museums in the South Moravian Region
Jewish museums in the Czech Republic
Buildings and structures in the South Moravian Region
Orthodox Judaism in the Czech Republic
Orthodox synagogues
Baroque synagogues in the Czech Republic